Susanne Hedberg (born 26 June 1972) is a Swedish former international footballer who played as a midfielder. She played for Sweden at the 1991 FIFA Women's World Cup and 1995 FIFA Women's World Cup. She scored against Brazil in the 1991 World Cup.

See also

References

1972 births
Living people
Women's association football midfielders
1991 FIFA Women's World Cup players
1995 FIFA Women's World Cup players
Swedish women's footballers
Sweden women's international footballers
Gideonsbergs IF players